Robert Emmett Fletcher Jr. (July 26, 1911 – May 23, 2013) was a Sacramento, California Agriculture inspector who quit his job to care for the fruit farms of Japanese families during World War II; after many Americans of Japanese descent were forcibly sent to internment camps as a result of Executive Order 9066.

Early life

Fletcher was born in San Francisco, California and he lived in the Bay Area city of Brentwood. He married Teresa Cassieri and the two had a son: Robert Fletcher III. After the war the family purchased land in Florin, and raised cattle.

In 1929, he graduated from high school in Brentwood. In 1933 he graduated from University of California, Davis. B.S. in Agriculture

History

After College Fletcher ran a peach orchard in Red Bluff, California. He then became a State Shipping Point Inspector. Starting in 1942 Fletcher began working for the Florin Fire Department. He eventually became the Chief of that fire department. In 1941 the Japanese Attacked Pearl Harbor. In 1942, Fletcher agreed to manage 90 acres of grapes for Japanese citizens who had been relocated as a result of Executive Order 9066. The grape farms were in the Florin area of Sacramento, California. Fletcher claimed to have been harassed by his own community and he also found bullet holes in his barn. Fletcher used the proceeds from farming the land to pay the taxes for the interned Japanese.
From 1942 to 1945 he managed the Tsukamoto, Nitta, and Okamoto farms. Fletcher's wife Teressa Cassieri also worked the farms. The agreement was for Fletcher to keep profits after paying the taxes on the farms, but instead he returned the money to the Japanese farmers when they were released.

Death and legacy
Fletcher died May 23, 2013 in Sacramento California, he was 101 years old. He did not get recognition for his efforts until later in life. Most of the interned Japanese lost everything during the war. In 2005 he spoke about Japanese Internment before the Lodi Historical Society in Lodi, California.In 2011 he was honored for his heroism and his story was being told in books.

References

External links
*Robert Emmett Fletcher Jr. at Legacy

1911 births
2013 deaths
Internment of Japanese Americans
American centenarians
Men centenarians
People from California
University of California, Davis alumni